Wang Xindong is a former Chinese team handball player and current coach. He serves as head coach for the China women's national handball team, and led the team at the 2011 World Women's Handball Championship in Brazil.

References

Year of birth missing (living people)
Living people
Chinese female handball players
Chinese handball coaches
Asian Games medalists in handball
Handball players at the 1994 Asian Games
Asian Games bronze medalists for China
Medalists at the 1994 Asian Games